Braeburn Schools, officially Braeburn Schools Limited or alternatively Braeburn Group of International Schools, is an international privately-owned educational management company that operates nine campuses throughout Kenya and Tanzania. The company delivers private international schools for primary and secondary school students and offers bridging courses from Kenyan KCSE to international A Levels, AS and A Level courses, the International Baccalaureate (IB), and BTEC National and Higher National Diploma courses; as well as teacher training.

Locations

References

External links 
 Official website

Companies based in Nairobi
Education companies of Kenya
Companies of Tanzania
1968 establishments in Kenya